The 2010 UTEP Miners football team represented the University of Texas at El Paso in the 2010 NCAA Division I FBS football season. The team's head coach was Mike Price, who served his seventh season at the post. The Miners played their home games at the Sun Bowl Stadium in El Paso, Texas and were members of Conference USA in the West Division. The Miners finished the regular season 6–6, 3–5 in C-USA play, and were invited to the New Mexico Bowl versus BYU. While UTEP lost the matchup, 52–24, the Miners improved upon their 4–8 record from the previous season. UTEP averaged 29,350 fans per game.

Schedule

References

UTEP
UTEP Miners football seasons
UTEP Miners football